Grange or Grangé is a French surname that may refer to the following people:
La Grange (disambiguation) – multiple people
Le Grange (disambiguation) – multiple people
David Grange (disambiguation) – multiple people
François-Cyrille Grange (born 1983), French alpine skier
Garland Grange (1906–1981), American football player
Gleneve Grange (born 1995), Jamaican athlete
Henri Grange (born 1934), French Olympic basketball player
Jacques Grange (born 1944), French interior designer
Jean-Christophe Grangé (born 1961), French mystery writer, journalist, and screenwriter
Jean-Baptiste Grange (born 1984), French alpine skier
Kenneth Grange (born 1929), British industrial designer
Leslie Grange (1894–1980), New Zealand geologist, soil scientist and scientific administrator
Lucie Grange (1839-1908), French medium, newspaper editor
Philip Grange (born 1956), English composer
Red Grange (1903–1991), American football player
Rob Grange (born 1950), American rock bass guitarist
Romain Grange (born 1988), French football player

See also
Granger (name)

French-language surnames